Fountain Park may refer to:

Fountain Park, Indiana
Fountain Park, Michigan
Fountain Park, Steuben County, Indiana
Fountain Park, Ohio
Fountain Park, St. Louis